The Institute for Sustainable Infrastructure (ISI) is a 501(c)(3) non-profit organization founded by the American Public Works Association (APWA), the American Society of Civil Engineers (ASCE), and the American Council of Engineering Companies (ACEC) in 2010, and operates under their oversight. The organization was created to develop and maintain a sustainability rating system for all civil infrastructure.

Envision rating system 
ISI maintains and administers the Envision Rating System for infrastructure projects. The rating system is published freely online, but there is a cost associated with requesting a third-party review of a project to receive "verification."

References

Non-profit organizations based in the United States
2010 establishments in the United States